Mosca may refer to:

People
 Alessia Mosca (born 1975), Italian politician
 Angelo Mosca (1937–2021), Canadian Football League player and professional wrestler
 Antonio Mosca (1870–1951), Italian painter
 Bianca Mosca (dead 1950), London-based fashion designer
 Claudio Mosca (born 1991), Argentine footballer 
 Enrique Mosca (1880-1950), Argentine lawyer and politician 
 Frank Mosca (born 1976), American film producer
 Gaetano Mosca (1858–1941), Italian political scientist, journalist and public servant
 Giuseppe Mosca (1772–1839), Italian opera composer
 Jacopo Mosca (born 1993), Italian cyclist
 Lino Mosca (1907−1992), Italian professional football player
 Luigi Mosca (1775–1824), Italian composer of operas and sacred music and singing teacher
 Maurizio Mosca (1940–2010),  Italian sports journalist and television presenter
 Michele Mosca, Italian physics researcher and professor of mathematics
 Paolo Mosca (1943–2014),  Italian journalist, writer, singer and television presenter
 Pierre Mosca (born 1949), Italian born French former footballer and coach
 Rafael Mosca (born 1982), Brazilian swimmer
 Rich Mosca (born c. 1948), former American football player and coach
 Sal Mosca (1927–2007), American jazz pianist
 Simone Mosca (1492–1554), Italian sculptor
 Stefania Mosca (1957–2009), Venezuelan writer

Fictional characters
 Mosca, of Ben Jonson's 1606 play Volpone
 Mosca, of The Godfather Part III
 Frank Mosca, of Miami Vice
 Gola Mosca, of Reborn! manga and anime series
 Walter Mosca, of Mario Puzo's novel The Dark Arena

Places
 Italian name of Moscow
 Mosca, Colorado, United States
 Mosca Pass, mountain pass in Alamosa County in the Rocky Mountains of Colorado in the United States
 Ponte Mosca, Turin, historic bridge in Turin, region of Piedmont, Italy

Businesses
 Mosca's, a restaurant near New Orleans in Avondale, Louisiana, United States

Aircraft
 Mosca-Bystritsky MBbis, fighter aircraft developed and used by the Imperial Russian Air Service during the First World War
 Polikarpov I-16, referred to by republicans during the Spanish Civil War as moscas

Italian-language surnames